Day by Day is the fourth studio album by Taiwanese Mandopop artist Hebe Tien from the girl group S.H.E. It was released on 13 July 2016 by HIM International Music.

Track listing

Music videos

Awards and nominations

References

2016 albums
Hebe Tien albums
HIM International Music albums